Tîrnova is a village in Edineț District, Moldova.

Notable people
 Grigore Eremei

References

Villages of Edineț District
Khotinsky Uyezd